The Syracuse University Alma Mater is the school song for Syracuse University, a private research university located in Syracuse, New York, United States. It was written by Junius W. Stevens in 1893, and is based on the then-popular song Annie Lisle. It was first sung under the title "Song of Syracuse" by the University Glee and Banjo Club on March 15, 1893. The song includes three verses, but only the first verse is commonly sung.

Alma mater

According to the 1997-1998 Syracuse University Student Handbook, author Junius W. Stevens recalled "while I was walking home across the city an idea for the song came to me. I had often noticed how the setting sun lighted up the walls of Crouse College long after dusk had fallen over the city and valley. As I walked through the empty streets, the words of a song took shape in my mind. By the time I reached home, the song was finished."

Fight song

The university also has a fight song entitled "Down the Field," commonly played after SU scores in athletic matches.

Alma Mater
American college songs
Alma mater songs
1893 songs